Pierre R Lamond (born September 12, 1930) is a venture capitalist in Silicon Valley, who has specialized in semiconductors, systems and cleantech. He was a partner at Sequoia Capital based in Menlo Park, California from 1981 until he left to join Vinod Khosla's Khosla Ventures as General Partner in March 2009. He left Khosla Ventures in 2014 and joined Eclipse Ventures as a Partner in 2015.

Career 

Lamond was born in France and studied Electrical Engineering at the University of Toulouse as an undergraduate, where he also received a master's degree in Physics. He then gained another master's degree in Electrical Engineering from Northeastern University.

His first job was an engineer with Transitron Electronics in 1957. In January 1962, he joined Gordon Moore's Fairchild Semiconductor, before he left in 1967 to run the company's spin-off, National Semiconductor, with Charles E. Sporck and Bob Widlar. At National Semiconductor they made the-then bold move of assembling all their semiconductor components outside the US, in Hong Kong and Singapore.

He has also been an executive at Coherent Radiation, where he was CEO until January 1976, and Advent Corp., a home-entertainment equipment company, where he was CEO from March 1976 until May 1977.

During his tenure at Sequoia Capital, Lamond was chairman at Cypress Semiconductor, Microchip Semiconductor, Vitesse Semiconductor, Redback Networks, Plumtree Software, Verisity and a Director of a number of other companies. While at Sequoia he acted as a mentor for the founders of YouTube. Despite being an early investor in several social network startups, he said in 2007 that "We're in Web 2.0 bubble in my opinion." In 2009, Sequoia acrimoniously split with Lamond after he had made personal investments from his family office and referred deals to his son.

He is a past president of the Western Association of Venture Capitalists. He had intended to retire in 2009, but instead joined Khosla, who specialise in energy-related companies, after being impressed with their focus on investing in research-based ventures.  At Khosla Ventures, Lamond was on the Board of Seeo, Soladigm, Cogenra, Seamicro (sold to AMD), Point Source Power, Skybox. In 2015, Lamond joined Lior Susan, who was to lead Formation 8's hardware fund before the firm's split. Instead they founded Eclipse Ventures where he is currently Partner Emeritus. At Eclipse, Lamond is on the Boards of Light Lab, Kindred, Diassess, Cerebras, Flex Logix, Visible, and Oxide Computer Company.

Personal life 
Lamond is married. His son David is President of Lamond Capital Partners. Lamond has two other children Patricia and Philip.

References

American venture capitalists
Silicon Valley people
French businesspeople
Northeastern University alumni
1930 births
University of Toulouse alumni
Living people